James Fiennes  may refer to:

James Fiennes, 1st Baron Saye and Sele (c. 1395–1450)
James Fiennes, 2nd Viscount Saye and Sele (c. 1602–1674), MP for Banbury